Rampside Leading Light, also known as "The Needle", is a leading light (navigation beacon) located in the Rampside area of Barrow-in-Furness, Cumbria, England. Built in 1875, it is the only surviving example of 13 such beacons built around Barrow during the late 19th century to aid vessels into the town's port. Rampside Lighthouse was designated a Grade II listed building by English Heritage in 1991.

See also
 Listed buildings in Barrow-in-Furness
 List of lighthouses in England

References

External links

  Port Barrow

Lighthouses completed in 1875
Buildings and structures in Barrow-in-Furness
Grade II listed lighthouses
Lighthouses in Cumbria